Alin Ilie Minteuan (born 12 November 1976) is a Romanian football coach and former player, currently he is an assistant coach at CFR Cluj.

Career
Minteuan's first team was CFR Cluj, where he went on to play for Universitatea Cluj, Rapid Bucharest, and Gloria Bistrita, also having two spells in the Israel Premier League at Hapoel Haifa and Hapoel Be'er Sheva. In 2005 he played 5 games, scoring one goal for CFR Cluj in the 2005 Intertoto Cup campaign in which the club reached the final. He played as a central defensive midfielder.

Coaching career
Minteuan worked for a while as an assistant coach at CFR Cluj, working with coaches Dušan Uhrin Jr., Vasile Miriuță, Sorin Cârțu, Toni Conceição, Jorge Costa, Andrea Mandorlini and Dan Petrescu, also having some spells as head coach of the team.

Honours

Club
CFR Cluj
Liga I: 2007–08
Cupa României: 2007–08
Divizia C: 1995–96
UEFA Intertoto Cup runner-up: 2005
Rapid București
Liga I: 1998–99
Hapoel Haifa
Toto Cup: 2000–01

Notes

References

External links

1976 births
Living people
Sportspeople from Cluj-Napoca
Romanian footballers
Association football midfielders
CFR Cluj players
FC Universitatea Cluj players
FC Rapid București players
ACF Gloria Bistrița players
Hapoel Haifa F.C. players
Hapoel Be'er Sheva F.C. players
Liga I players
Liga II players
Liga III players
Israeli Premier League players
Romanian expatriate footballers
Romanian expatriate sportspeople in Israel
Expatriate footballers in Israel
Romanian football managers
FC Unirea Dej managers
CFR Cluj managers
CSM Reșița managers